Jordan competed at the 1988 Summer Olympics in Seoul, South Korea. Seven competitors, five men and two women, took part in nine events in five sports.

Competitors
The following is the list of number of competitors in the Games.

Archery

Women

Boxing

Fencing

Men

Table Tennis

Women

Wrestling

Men's Freestyle

Men's Greco-Roman

References

External links
Official Olympic Reports

Nations at the 1988 Summer Olympics
1988
1988 in Jordanian sport